Northern Collegiate Institute & Vocational School (NCIVS) is a Canadian public secondary school (high school). It is located in Sarnia, Ontario, Canada. It is one of the 13 secondary schools within Lambton Kent District School Board.

Departments and courses

Arts

 Visual arts: visual arts, crafts, ceramics, media arts
 Music: instrumental music/band, guitar music, vocals, music and computers
 Drama

Business studies 
Information and communication in business, introduction to business, marketing, accounting, entrepreneurship, business leadership, international business

Canadian and world studies 

 Geography: Canadian geography, travel and tourism, world issues
 History: Canadian history since WW1, American history, world history since 1900, world history to the 15th century, world history since the 15th century, Canadian culture and identity
 Civics: civics and citizenship, Canadian kaw, Canadian and international law

Classical studies and international languages 

 French (core and immersion), Spanish

Computer studies 

 Introduction to computer studies, computer programming, computer science

English 

 English, Aboriginal contemporary voices, writer's craft

Guidance and career 

 Career studies, leadership and peer support

Health and physical education 
NCIVS' sport and recreation facilities include three gymnasiums, a weight/fitness room, two outdoor soccer fields, a football field and a 400-meter track.

 Healthy active living (gym), personal fitness, kinesiology

Mathematics 

 College stream: foundation of math, foundations for college math
 University stream: principles of math, functions, data management, advanced functions, calculus and vectors
 Math for work and everyday life

Native studies 
Contemporary First Nations, Metis and Inuit issues and perspectives, issues of Indigenous peoples in a global context

Science 
There are 7 science labs and classrooms, 4 of which were recently renovated.

Science, biology, chemistry, physics, environmental science

Social science and humanities 

 Foods: foods and nutrition, nutrition and health
 Family studies: working with infants and young children, raising healthy children, families in Canada
 Social sciences: anthropology psychology and sociology, philosophy, challenge and change in society
 Fashion: understanding fashion

Technological education 

Transportation
The transportation shop has 2 car lifts, and an $80,000 driving simulator that was donated by Shell in April 2017. The transportation department also runs the Northern eco-team, the only Canadian high school to compete in the Shell Eco-marathon.
Manufacturing
Northern's manufacturing room has 10 machine lathes, a horizontal and two vertical mills, two drill presses, three bandsaws, and various other smaller machines and tools.
 Communications: communications technology, print and graphics (yearbook)
 Technological design: design and the environment, architecture, design
 Construction: construction technology, custom woodworking
Computer engineering technology

Student support services

 Student services
 Co-op
 Resource
 Careers
 Computers

Sports
Northern competes locally within LKSSAA, under the SWOSSAA association, a part of the provincial OFSAA organization.

NCIVS is home to the Vikings football team, which has currently won 11 of the past 11 LSSAA Senior Championships in the Sarnia area local high school league, as well as many other sports and non-sports related competitions.

Fall sports

Women's basketball
 Junior soccer
 Men's football
 Cross country running
 Golf
 Men's volleyball
 Tennis

Winter sports

 Men's basketball
 Curling
 Swimming
 Wrestling
 Women's volleyball
 Hockey
Badminton

Spring sports

 Rugby
 Baseball
 Senior soccer
 Track and field

Notable alumni

Sami Khan – filmmaker
Steven Stamkos – 1st overall pick in 2008 NHL entry draft (Tampa Bay Lightning)
Dave Salmoni – animal trainer, entertainer, producer
Steve Molitor – championship boxer
Steve Wormith – professional football player and criminologist
Karen Kidd – aquatic ecotoxicologist

See also
List of high schools in Ontario

References

External links
 Northern Eco-Team

High schools in Sarnia
Educational institutions in Canada with year of establishment missing